Hakim Ghulam Imam was a Persian physician, whose dates are uncertain.

He composed a Persian-language treatise on therapeutics titled Ilaj al-ghuraba ("The Treatment of Rare Conditions"), which is preserved today in only one recorded manuscript, now in India, but which was also printed in India many times in the 19th century. 

Nothing is known of the author, though The National Library of Medicine database places him to be active in India before the 19th century.

Sources

For copies and printings of his treatise, see: 

 C.A. Storey, Persian Literature: A Bio-Bibliographical Survey. Volume II, Part 2: E.Medicine (London: Royal Asiatic Society, 1971), p. 318, no. 70

See also

List of Iranian scientists

Iranian physicians
Year of birth missing
Year of death missing